Rosa Warrens (February 24, 1821 – November 8, 1878) was a Swedish-born poet and translator.

Biography
Rosa Warrens was born into a Jewish family in Karlskrona in 1821. At the age of five she went with her parents to Hamburg, where she remained until her father's death in 1861. She then moved to Berlin with her mother, with whom she lived in quiet seclusion. After the latter's death in the summer of 1878, she settled in Copenhagen. She died from a heart attack soon after her arrival.

Despite having never attended a public school or received regular instruction, Warrens devoted herself to Swedish literature and Norse mythology, translating into German the northern folk-songs in the original metres. A volume of her original poems appeared in 1873.

Publications

References
 

1821 births
1878 deaths
19th-century Swedish poets
Danish–German translators
English–German translators
German-language poets
Jewish poets
Jewish Swedish writers
Jewish translators
Jewish women writers
People from Karlskrona
Swedish emigrants to Germany
Swedish translators
Swedish women poets
Swedish–German translators
Translators from Icelandic